Sobocisko  is a village in the administrative district of Gmina Oława, within Oława County, Lower Silesian Voivodeship, in south-western Poland.

The village has an approximate population of 400.

The name of the village is of Polish origin and comes from the word soból, which means "sable".

Sports
The local football club is Czarni Sobocisko. It competes in the lower leagues.

References

Villages in Oława County